Alyona Igorevna Arshinova (born 3 March 1985 in Dresden, East Germany) also known by typo name Alena Arshinova is a Russian politician, model and sociologist. She is a deputy of the State Duma of the Russian Federation.

Biography
Alyona Arsinova was born in 1985 in Dresden since her father, a member of the Soviet Army, was stationed there.

Arshinova holds dual citizenship of Russia and Transnistria. From 2002 to 2007 she studied sociology at the state university of Transnistria, the T.G. Shevchenko University in Tiraspol.

Arshinova led the political youth organization Breakthrough (Russian: Proriv) which defends the independence of Transnistria with close ties to Russia, and opposes union with Moldova. She has written articles for the Transnistrian news agency «Lenta PMR». In December 2005 Arshinova was interviewed by the German news magazine Der Spiegel. In 2009 she was a fellow of the John Smith Memorial Trust programme for democracy and good governance.

In 2007, Alyona Arshinova moved to Moscow for postgraduate work in sociology at Lomonosov University. Her dissertation is titled "Youth Extremism in Russia". She has become involved in Russian politics. On 22 December 2010, Arshinova was elected as co-chairman of the co-ordinating council of the Young Guard of United Russia ("Molodaya Gvardia"), the youth wing of Russia's ruling party. For the 2011 Russian legislative election, she contested a seat in the State Duma.

She is one of the members of the State Duma the United States Treasury sanctioned on 24 March 2022 in response to the 2022 Russian invasion of Ukraine.

See also 
 Young Guard of United Russia
 Breakthrough (Transnistria)

References

External links 
 
 Faces of the new Europe: Alena Arshinova
 Portrait & Interview (in Russian)
 Transnistria's Breakthrough 

Russian political activists
United Russia politicians
1985 births
Living people
Proriv (Transnistria) politicians
Transnistrian women in politics
21st-century Russian women politicians
Plekhanov Russian University of Economics alumni
Sixth convocation members of the State Duma (Russian Federation)
Seventh convocation members of the State Duma (Russian Federation)
Eighth convocation members of the State Duma (Russian Federation)
Russian individuals subject to the U.S. Department of the Treasury sanctions